Eric Red (born Eric Joseph Durdaller; February 16, 1961) is an American screenwriter, director and novelist, best known for writing the horror films The Hitcher and Near Dark, as well as writing and directing Cohen and Tate.

Biography

Early life
Red was born in Pittsburgh, Pennsylvania, the son of Nancy (née Pickhardt) and Cornelius Gerard Durdaller. He attended the AFI Conservatory and graduated in 1983.

Screenwriter career
The first film written by Red was Gunmen's Blues, a short he produced and directed while a student at the AFI Conservatory. He went broke trying to get national distribution for the film and had to drive a cab in New York City for a year to recoup.

His AFI thesis script, The Hitcher, was produced in 1986. A major studio remake of The Hitcher was released in 2007 with Red as a consultant.  From the '80s through the '00s, his subsequent produced screenplays were Near Dark, Cohen and Tate, Blue Steel, Body Parts, The Last Outlaw, Undertow, Bad Moon and 100 Feet.

Director career
The first feature film directed by Red was Cohen and Tate in 1987. He subsequently directed the films Body Parts (1990), Undertow (1995), Bad Moon (1996) and 100 Feet (2008).

Novelist career
Eric Red published his first novel, Don't Stand So Close, in 2011. His subsequent published novels are The Guns of Santa Sangre (2013), The Wolves of El Diablo (2017), It Waits Below (2014), Noose (2018), Hanging Fire (2019), White Knuckle (2015), Strange Fruit (2014), Branded (2021) and The Crimson Trail (2021).

Car crash
Following a car accident, Red crashed his truck into a crowded bar in Los Angeles on May 31, 2000, resulting in the deaths of two patrons. After the incident, Red apparently exited his vehicle and attempted suicide by slitting his own throat with a piece of broken glass. Red survived the incident, was taken to the hospital under an alias and was released weeks later. No criminal charges were brought against Red, but a jury in a civil suit awarded monetary damages to the families of the victims. The suit, which awarded over a million dollars to the families of the two men killed in the accident, was appealed to state and federal courts, which confirmed the original jury finding.

Filmography
Short films

Feature films

TV movies

Bibliography
Containment (2005) [graphic novel]
Don't Stand So Close (2011)
The Guns of Santa Sangre (2013)
It Waits Below (2014)
Strange Fruit (2014)
White Knuckle (2015)
The Wolves of El Diablo (2017)
Noose (2018)
Hanging Fire (2019)
Branded (2021)
The Crimson Trail (2021)
Stopping Power (2021)

References

External links
 

1961 births
American film directors
Horror film directors
American male screenwriters
Living people
Writers from Pittsburgh
Screenwriters from Pennsylvania